The 2026 Winter Olympics, officially the XXV Olympic Winter Games and also known as Milano Cortina 2026 ( or ), is an upcoming international multi-sport event scheduled to take place from 6 to 22 February 2026. The event will have the Italian cities of Milan and Cortina d'Ampezzo as main host cities. The joint bid from the two cities beat another joint bid from Swedish cities Stockholm–Åre by 47–34 votes to be elected host cities at the 134th Session of the International Olympic Committee (IOC) in Lausanne, Switzerland, on 24 June 2019.

This will be the fourth Olympic Games hosted in Italy, the second for Cortina d'Ampezzo (previously hosted the 1956 Winter Olympics), and the first hosted in Milan. It will be the first Olympic Games featuring multiple host cities in an official form and will be the first Winter Olympics since Sarajevo 1984 at which the opening and closing ceremonies will be held in different venues. In addition to the two main host cities, another nine around the Italian center-north region will host the events. It will mark the 20th anniversary of the 2006 Winter Olympics in Turin, the most recent Olympics in Italy, and the 70th anniversary of the 1956 Winter Olympics in Cortina d'Ampezzo, the first Olympics held in Italy. It will be also the last of the two consecutive Olympics to be held in Europe with France hosting the 2024 Summer Olympics in Paris.

Bidding process

Host city selection
Milan and Cortina d'Ampezzo were elected as the host cities on 24 June 2019 at the 134th IOC Session in Lausanne, Switzerland. The three Italian IOC members, Franco Carraro, Ivo Ferriani and Giovanni Malagò, and two Swedish IOC members, Gunilla Lindberg and Stefan Holm, were ineligible to vote in this host city election under the rules of the Olympic Charter.

Venues

Milan Cluster 

San Siro – Opening ceremonies 
Fiera Milano - Speed Skating
PalaItalia Santa Giulia – main ice hockey venue
Palatrussardi – secondary ice hockey venue 
Piazza del Duomo – Medal Plaza and Live Site
Mediolanum Forum, Assago – figure skating, short-track speed skating

Cortina d'Ampezzo Cluster
Olimpia delle Tofane Slope – alpine skiing
South Tyrol Arena, Antholz – biathlon
Pista Eugenio Monti – bobsleigh, luge and skeleton
Stadio olimpico del ghiaccio – curling

Valtellina Cluster
Pista Stelvio, Bormio – alpine skiing & ski mountaineering.
Mottolino/Sitas-Tagliede/Carosello 3000, Livigno – snowboarding, freestyle skiing

Val di Fiemme Cluster
Stadio del salto "Giuseppe Dal Ben", Predazzo – ski jumping, Nordic combined
Lago di Tesero Cross Country Stadium, Tesero – cross-country skiing, Nordic combined

Verona
Verona Arena – closing ceremonies

Sports
Numbers in parentheses indicate the number of medal events contested in each discipline.

On 18 June 2021, the International Olympic Committee issued a proposal for a new winter sport, ski mountaineering, for the 2026 Winter Olympics. The proposal was approved during the IOC's session in Tokyo on 20 July.

On 24 June 2022, the IOC announced the final version of the program for this edition. Present in the last two editions of the Games, the mixed team event of alpine skiing was dropped from the program. This removal was done for logistical reasons, as men and women will be competing at different resorts that are very far apart. The IOC together with the FIS decided to provisionally place the combined event in both sexes in the same sport, given the low technical level and the high number of accidents during the Beijing 2022 Winter Olympics. However, along with the three ski mountaineering events, five new events have been added to the Olympic program in four sports that were already on the program. In this way, a total of 114 events in eight sports were confirmed. 

Freestyle skiing: Men's and women's dual moguls
Luge: Women's doubles. Open doubles switched to being exclusive to men only.
Ski jumping: Women's large hill individual
Ski mountaineering: Men's and Women's sprint, mixed relay
Skeleton: Mixed team

Marketing
The official emblem for the games was decided through a global online vote that opened on 6 March 2021. The two candidate emblems were unveiled at the Sanremo Music Festival 2021 by former Italian Olympic gold medallists Federica Pellegrini and Alberto Tomba and are nicknamed "Dado" and "Futura". They were both designed by Landor Associates. The vote closed on 25 March 2021, with the winning emblem, the "Futura" emblem, announced on 30 March 2021.

During the Sanremo Music Festival 2022, two candidates for the official anthem of the Games were presented, with a vote opening afterward: on 7 March 2022, "Fino all'alba" ("Until the dawn")—composed by the youth music group La Cittadina of the San Pietro Martire in Seveso, and performed during Sanremo by Arisa—was announced as the winner.

Broadcasting rights
Albania – RTSH
Australia – Nine Network
Austria – ORF
Belgium – RTBF, VRT
Brazil – Grupo Globo
Bulgaria – BNT
Canada – CBC/Radio-Canada
China – CMG
Croatia – HRT
Czech Republic – ČT
Denmark – DR, TV 2
Europe (except Russia and Belarus) – EBU, Warner Bros. Discovery
Estonia – ERR
Finland – Yle
France – France Télévisions
Germany – ARD, ZDF
Greece – ERT
Hungary – MTVA
Iceland – RÚV
Ireland – RTÉ
 Israel – Sports Channel
Italy – RAI
Japan – Japan Consortium
Latvia – LTV
Lithuania – LRT
Macau – TDM
Montenegro – RTCG
Netherlands – NOS
North Korea – JTBC
Norway – NRK
Poland – TVP
Slovakia – RTVS
Slovenia – RTV
South Korea – JTBC
Spain – RTVE
Sweden – SVT
Switzerland – SRG SSR
Ukraine – Suspilne
United Kingdom – BBC
United States – NBCUniversal

On 16 January 2023, the IOC announced that it had renewed its European broadcast rights agreement with Warner Bros. Discovery Sports to last from 2026 through 2032. The contract covers pay television and streaming rights to the Summer, Winter, and Youth Olympics on Eurosport and Discovery+ in 49 European territories. Unlike the previous contract, where corporate precursor Discovery, Inc. was responsible for sub-licensing them to broadcasters in each country, free-to-air rights packages were concurrently awarded to the European Broadcasting Union and its members, covering at least 100 hours of content during each Winter Olympics.

In the United States, these Games will once again be broadcast by NBCUniversal properties, as part of its US$7.75 billion contract to air the Olympics through 2032. In a scenario now guaranteed under the National Football League's new media rights agreements that begin in 2023, NBC will serve as broadcaster of the Super Bowl (which is now rotated among all four of the United States' major commercial FTA networks) during Winter Olympic years that fall under the contract.

See also

Notes

References

External links
 
 Milano–Cortina 2026

 
2026
Winter Olympics
2026 in multi-sport events
2026 in winter sports
Olympic Games in Italy
Winter Olympics
February 2026 sports events
Sports competitions in Milan
Sport in Cortina d'Ampezzo